ANGUS may refer to:

 Acoustically Navigated Geological Underwater Survey, a deep-towed still-camera sled for underwater exploration 
 Air National Guard of the United States, a designated military reserve component of the United States

See also
 Angus (disambiguation)